W. Duncan Lee (July 2, 1884 – March 13, 1952) was an American 
architect working primarily in the style of Colonial Revival who designed and built the majority of his structures in the city of Richmond, Virginia and its environs.

Among Lee's noted works in the capital city of the State of Virginia and its surrounds are the Tuckahoe Apartments (1928-29), the Evelynton mansion on the Evelynton Plantation (1937), 
Westbourne (designed in 1915- built in 1919), and a wing of the Virginia Executive Mansion ((1908). Also, in 1929, Lee was responsible for the restoration of the Old Custom House in Yorktown, Virginia.

The "W" in Lee's name was merely added after Lee found his name too brief compared to other architects such as John Russell Pope, William Lawrence Bottomley, and Alfred Charles Bossom.

References

Year of birth missing
Year of death missing
American architects
People from Richmond, Virginia